The Charles Russell House is a historic house at 993 Main Street in Winchester, Massachusetts.  The -story wood-frame house was built by Charles Russell in 1841, on a site that was one of the first settled in what is now Winchester.  The five-bay facade has a center entry that is framed by sidelight and transom windows, and is sheltered by a portico with fluted Ionic columns.  The house also has corner pilasters and a high entablature.

The house was listed on the National Register of Historic Places in 1989.

See also
National Register of Historic Places listings in Winchester, Massachusetts

References

Houses on the National Register of Historic Places in Winchester, Massachusetts
Houses in Winchester, Massachusetts